Wreaths at the Foot of the Mountain is a 1984 Chinese film about the life of the soldiers in a PLA army company before, during and after the Sino-Vietnamese War. It is based on the novel written by Li Cunbao, and directed by Xie Jin, starring Lü Xiaohe, Tang Guoqiang, Siqin Gaowa, Gai Ke and He Wei.

The film won the 5th Golden Rooster for Best Screenwriter, Best Leading Actor (Lu Xiaohe), Best Supporting Actor (He Wei) and Best Editing (Zhou Dingwen) in 1985.

References

External links 

Wreaths at the Foot of the Mountain at the Chinese Movie Database
https://www.youtube.com/watch?v=4yZCo_cVKtI| Full movie available

Sino-Vietnamese War films
1984 films
1980s Mandarin-language films
Chinese war films
Films directed by Xie Jin
1980s war films